Justice Kennon may refer to:

 Robert F. Kennon, associate justice of the Louisiana Supreme Court
 William Kennon Sr., associate justice of the Ohio Supreme Court